The 1967 Oklahoma Sooners football team represented the University of Oklahoma during the 1967 NCAA University Division football season. Led by first-year head coach Chuck Fairbanks, they played their home games at Oklahoma Memorial Stadium and competed as members of the Big Eight Conference. The Sooners won all seven conference games and finished the season with one loss they upset number 9 Colorado on November 4th by a score of 23-0 in Norman; they defeated Tennessee, 26–24, to win the Orange Bowl in Miami, Florida.

Entering his second season as head coach, 37-year-old Jim Mackenzie suffered a fatal heart attack at his Norman home in late April. Assistant coach Fairbanks, age 33, was promoted several days later.

Schedule

Roster

Season summary

Preseason

Regular season

Kansas

Dad's Day

Postseason

Orange Bowl

Rankings

Statistics

Awards
All-Big 8: OT Bob Kalsu, DE John Koller, NG Granville Liggins, RB Steve Owens, QB Bob Warmack

Postseason

NFL/AFL draft
The following players were drafted into the National Football League or American Football League following the season.

References

Oklahoma
Oklahoma Sooners football seasons
Big Eight Conference football champion seasons
Orange Bowl champion seasons
Oklahoma Sooners football